Darker Handcraft is the third studio album by the American grindcore band Trap Them. The album was first released in a vinyl LP format on March 1, 2011 and on CD and digital formats two weeks later on March 15, 2011 through Prosthetic Records. It's also the group's first release through Prosthetic after announcing their departure from Deathwish Inc. in 2009. Darker Handcraft was produced by Kurt Ballou of Converge.

Darker Handcraft is the only Trap Them album recorded with drummer Chris Maggio formerly of the hardcore band Coliseum. Vocalist Ryan McKenny observed a stronger bond among band members with the addition of Maggio. McKenny noted that, during the writing process, Trap Them was focused and never got mad at one another.

Track listing

Reception
Darker Handcraft has received mainly positive reviews, from many critics. AllMusic stated "Trap Them and their ilk are bound to leave many happily damaged eardrums before they runs their course". Dre Okorley of AbsolutePunk remarked "Darker Handcraft deciphers what Leatherface turned into his special forte: it stretches skin and curdles blood like it's a walk in the park". Though minor flaws were noted in the album, it appeared in the upper percentile of the majority of heavy music sites.

Personnel
Trap Them
 Brian Izzi – guitar
 Stephen Lacour – bass
 Chris Maggio – drums
 Ryan McKenney – vocals

Additional personnel
 Kevin Baker (The Hope Conspiracy) – guest vocals on "Evictionaries"
 Kurt Ballou – engineering, production
 Scott Hull – mastering at Visceral Sound
 Vberkvlt – artwork

References

2011 albums
Albums produced by Kurt Ballou
Prosthetic Records albums
Trap Them albums